George Lynn may refer to:
 George Lynn (astronomer) (1676–1742), British astronomer and antiquary
 George Lynn (composer) (1915–1989), American composer, conductor, pianist, organist, singer, and music educator
 George Lynn (cricketer) (1848–1921), English cricketer
 George Lynn (actor) (1906–1964), American film and television actor